Žleby is a municipality and village in Kutná Hora District in the Central Bohemian Region of the Czech Republic. It has about 1,400 inhabitants.

Administrative parts
Villages of Kamenné Mosty, Markovice and Zehuby are administrative parts of Žleby.

Geography
It lies in a flat agricultural landscape of the Central Elbe Table. The Doubrava River flows through the municipality.

History
The first written mention of Žleby is from 1278. In the Middle Ages, it used to be a market town. It was promoted to a market town in 1356, when it was owned by King Charles IV.

Sights

Žleby is well known for the Žleby Castle. Its existence was first mentioned in 1289. It was originally a Gothic castle, later modified in the late Renaissance and late Baroque styles. in 1849–1868, it was rebuilt into its current neo-Gothic romantic form. For its artistic and historical value, Žleby Castle is protected as a national cultural monument.

The castle's deer park is known as one of two preserves that cherish white stag, and has plenty of other wild animals, especially the hunting birds. It was founded in 1973 and with an area of 130 ha it is one of the largest deer parks in the country.

The Church of the Nativity of the Virgin Mary is originally a Renaissance building, baroque rebuilt in the second half of the 18th century.

References

External links

Villages in Kutná Hora District